Bieszczady National Park is the third-largest national park in Poland, located in Subcarpathian Voivodeship in the extreme southeast corner of the country. In 2021, the national park became a UNESCO World Heritage Site (as an extension to the Ancient and Primeval Beech Forests of the Carpathians and Other Regions of Europe).

History
The park was created in 1973. At the time it covered only , but over the years it was enlarged four times. The last enlargements took place in 1996 (when the park incorporated the former villages of Bukowiec, Beniowa and Carynskie) and in 1999 (when the former villages of Dzwiniacz, Tarnawa and Sokoliki were added).

It occupies , covering the highest areas of the Polish part of the Bieszczady Mountains.

Geography
Forests cover about 80% of Bieszczady National Park. The woods are mainly natural; in some cases it can be said that they have preserved their pristine character.

Fauna

Animal life is abundant with several species of endangered animals thriving in the area, among them brown bears, grey wolf, European wildcat, wild boar, European beavers, European otter, and European lynx as well as deer (such as moose) and European bison (over 500 live in the area). The park contains interesting bird species, including eagles and owls, and is home to the largest Polish population of Aesculapian snakes.

The park is sparsely populated (less than 1 person per km2), which means that animals can roam freely. The region is very popular among tourists, but there are not many facilities. Around 70% of the park is regarded as strict preserve, which means that the use of trails is restricted. The park's authorities promote walking trips.

Occupation
Since 30% of trees inside area 219a shall be targeted by cuttings. So in January 2021 areas inside the forest got squatted by environmental activist. feminism collectiv Wilczyce made up treehouses and constructions likely German Hambach Forest protesting against logging in the forest. Occupants where demonstrating against destruction of biosphere, humanmade climate change and European foreign- and refugee policies and feminism.

The eviction has taken place at the 8th of August 2022.  Straż Graniczna and police officially searched for Russian soldiers in that area, because of the Ukrainian war and the location at the boarder. They claimed having found drugs. After taking the activists to custody the structures where destroyed.

Hiking trails
 European walking route E8

References

External links 
 The Board of Polish National Parks
 Bieszczady National Park
 

National parks of Poland
Parks in Podkarpackie Voivodeship
Protected areas of the Eastern Carpathians
Biosphere reserves of Poland
Natura 2000 in Poland
1973 establishments in Poland
Protected areas established in 1973
Lesko County
Bieszczady County